Chodron or Chödrön is a surname. Notable people with the surname include:

Alphonse Chodron de Courcel (1835–1919), French diplomat and politician
Geoffroy Chodron de Courcel (1912–1992), French diplomat
Bernadette Chirac (née Chodron de Courcel), spouse of Jacques Chirac
Pema Chödrön, American woman who was ordained as a Buddhist nun in the Tibetan lineage of Buddhism in 1981
Thubten Chodron, American Tibetan Buddhist nun and a central figure in reinstating the Bhikshuni

de:Chödrön